The South Col is a sharp-edged col between Mount Everest and Lhotse, the highest and fourth-highest mountains in the world, respectively. The South Col is typically swept by high winds, leaving it free of significant snow accumulation. Since 1950 (when Tibet was closed), most Everest expeditions have left from Nepal and gone via the southeast ridge and the South Col (instead of via the North Col). When climbers attempt to climb Everest from the southeast ridge in Nepal, their final camp (usually Camp IV) is situated on the South Col.

The South Col was first reached on 12 May 1952 by Aubert, Lambert, and Flory of Edouard Wyss-Dunant's Swiss Mount Everest Expedition that failed to reach the summit. The following year, when Mount Everest was first climbed, Wilfrid Noyce and the Sherpa Annullu were the first climbers on the expedition to reach the col. According to John Hunt, the expedition leader:

Once on the South Col, climbers have entered the death zone; altitude sickness is a significant threat at this elevation and can easily prove fatal. It is also difficult to sleep, and most climbers' digestive systems have significantly slowed or completely stopped. This is because it is more efficient at this altitude for the body to use stored energy sources than to digest new food.  Most climbers will begin using supplemental oxygen here and have a maximum of only two or three days for making summit bids. Clear weather and low winds are critical factors in deciding whether to make a summit attempt. If weather does not cooperate within these short few days, climbers are forced to descend, many all the way back down to Base Camp. Climbers rarely get a second chance to return to the South Col in a specific expedition.

In 2005, Didier Delsalle of France landed a Eurocopter AS350 B3 helicopter on the South Col. Two days later he made the first helicopter landing on the summit of Mount Everest, a feat he subsequently repeated. 

In May 2019, the highest weather station in the world was installed at Everest, with one location at the South Col, and another on a place higher up on the peak known as "The Balcony" as well as some other stations and locations.

See also 
 Kangshung face

References

External links

 Painting of the South Col

Mount Everest
Mountain passes of the Himalayas
Mountain passes of Nepal
Mountain passes of Tibet
Mountain passes of China